Elachista altaica is a moth of the family Elachistidae. It is found in Russia (Altai, Tuva and the southern Ural Mountains).

References

altaica
Moths described in 1998
Moths of Asia
Moths of Europe